
Year 29 BC was either a common year starting on Friday or Saturday or a leap year starting on Thursday, Friday or Saturday (link will display the full calendar) of the Julian calendar (the sources differ, see leap year error for further information) and a leap year starting on Thursday of the Proleptic Julian calendar. At the time, it was known as the Year of the Consulship of Octavian and Appuleius (or, less frequently, year 725 Ab urbe condita). The denomination 29 BC for this year has been used since the early medieval period, when the Anno Domini calendar era became the prevalent method in Europe for naming years.

Events 
 By place 

 Roman Republic 
 Octavian Caesar becomes Roman Consul for the fifth time. His partner is Sextus Appuleius. He is granted the title of imperator, and for the third time in Roman history the doors of the Temple of Janus are closed, signalling peace.
 Octavian celebrates, in Rome, three triumphs on consecutive days (August 13, August 14, and August 15) to commemorate his victories in Illyricum, Actium and Egypt.
 Marcus Licinius Crassus campaigns successfully in the Balkans, killing the king of the Bastarnae by his own hand, but is denied the right to dedicate the spolia opima by Octavian.
 Sofia, modern day capital of Bulgaria, is conquered by the Romans and becomes known as Ulpia Serdica.
 Start of the Cantabrian Wars against Roman occupation in Hispania.

 By topic 

 Literature 
 March 1 – Horace writes the ode Occidit Daci Cotisonis agmen.
 Composition of The Aeneid by Virgil begins.

Births

Deaths 
 Antiochus II, Armenian prince of Commagene (executed)
 Mariamne I, wife of Herod the Great (executed) (or 28 BC)
 Ptolemy Philadelphus, Ptolemaic prince of Egypt (b. 36 BC)

References